The Tick-Borne Disease Alliance (TBDA) was a US national not-for-profit charity that was dedicated to raising awareness, supporting initiatives and promoting advocacy to find a cure for tick-borne diseases, including Lyme.

TBDA was formed in the spring of 2012 by Staci Grodin, the co-founder of the Turn the Corner Foundation, and David Roth, the co-founder of the Tick-Borne Disease Initiative. Roth has stated that he knew very little about Lyme disease or any other tick-borne diseases until he was diagnosed with Lyme himself, motivating him to raise awareness and increase funding for diagnostic testing.

Bite Back for a Cure 
In 2013, TBDA launched the Bite Back for a Cure campaign, a national grassroots campaign to build support for the fight against tick-borne diseases through raising awareness and through supporting tick-borne disease research. Candice Accola, star of The Vampire Diaries, is a spokesperson.

Fundraising 
TBDA held its first annual gala on May 16, 2012, at Chelsea Piers in New York City. The benefit helped support TBDA's public awareness and advocacy campaign, and helped raise money for research to find an accurate diagnostic tool. On May 2, 2013, TBDA held the Tick-Borne Disease Alliance 2nd Annual Benefit, also at Chelsea Piers. Candice Accola was the host.

Advocacy 
On March 11, 2013, TBDA hosted a forum with U.S. Senators Kirsten Gillibrand (D-N.Y.), Richard Blumenthal (D-CT) and Congressman Chris Gibson (R-NY) at Weill Cornell Medical College in New York City to discuss the fight against the silent epidemic of tick-borne diseases, including Lyme disease. Gillibrand, Blumenthal, Weill Cornell Medical College's dean Dr. Laurie H. Glimcher and co-chairman of TBDA David Roth were distinguished speakers at the forum.

Merger 
In February 2014, TBDA merged with the Stamford-based Lyme Research Alliance to form a new charity, the Global Lyme Alliance. The GLA has been criticized for promoting the pseudoscientific diagnosis of chronic Lyme disease, with David Gorski of Science-Based Medicine commenting the Alliance "appears very much into chronic Lyme disease woo."

References

External links
 http://tbdalliance.org/about-tbda
 http://nycmedtech.info/tbda/
 https://www.youtube.com/watch?v=uBSFI5QObkU
 http://www.prweb.com/releases/2013/7/prweb10910541.htm
 http://lyme-aware.org/news/lyme-news/1329-the-new-tick-borne-disease-alliance.html
 http://hollywoodlife.com/2013/05/03/candice-accola-lyme-disease-tbda-interview/
 http://weill.cornell.edu/tickborne/

Medical and health organizations based in New York (state)
Lyme disease
2012 establishments in the United States
2015 disestablishments in the United States
Defunct organizations based in New York (state)